Úna Claffey (born 1947) is an Irish former journalist and political adviser.

Born in Dublin, Claffey completed Bachelor of Arts in History, Ethics, Politics and Metaphysics from University College Dublin. She also studied politics in the United States and holds a diploma in French language and literature from Aix-Marseille University in Nice.

Claffey joined RTÉ in 1977 as a production assistant. In 1982 she joined Today Tonight as a reporter before taking over as host of Morning Ireland. Claffey later became a member of RTÉ's political team where she worked as a political correspondent based in Leinster House.

In 2000 Claffey was appointed political adviser to Taoiseach Bertie Ahern.

References

1947 births
Living people
RTÉ newsreaders and journalists
Irish women journalists
Irish women radio presenters